The AI Star/Centinela Hospital Classic was a golf tournament on the LPGA Tour from 1988 to 1989. It was played at the Rancho Park Golf Course in Los Angeles, California.

Winners
1989 Pat Bradley
1988 Nancy Lopez

References

Former LPGA Tour events
Golf in Los Angeles
Women's sports in California
Recurring sporting events established in 1988
Recurring sporting events disestablished in 1989
1988 establishments in California
1989 disestablishments in California